The 1951 Challenge Desgrange-Colombo was the fourth edition of the Challenge Desgrange-Colombo. It included eleven races: all the races form the 1950 edition were retained with the addition of Liège–Bastogne–Liège. Paris–Tours moved from a spring slot to an autumn slot. Louison Bobet won the competition by a single point to 1950 champion Ferdinand Kübler. France won their first nations championship.

Races

Final standings

Riders

Nations

References

 
Challenge Desgrange-Colombo
Challenge Desgrange-Colombo